Arisman (also Romanized as Arīsmān and Erīsmān; also known as Azīsmān and Brīsmān) is a village in Emamzadeh Aqaali Abbas Rural District, Emamzadeh District, Natanz County, Isfahan Province, Iran. At the 2006 census, its population was 1,745, in 489 families.

Ancient metallurgy
At Arisman, some of the oldest evidence of silver production in the world has been found - such as the litharge fragments and cakes. This was taking place around 3600 BC. Arsenical copper production was also taking place.

The ore was mined from some polymetallic ore deposits in the same area. These deposits contain a mixture of copper, arsenic, lead, and silver. First, the ore was smelted, and then the second step of cupellation was used to separate arsenical copper and silver.

See also
Tepe Sialk

References 

Populated places in Natanz County